Capital. A Critique of Political Economy. Volume I: The Process of Production of Capital is the first of three treatises that make up Das Kapital, a critique of political economy by the German philosopher and economist Karl Marx. First published on 14 September 1867, Volume I was the product of a decade of research and redrafting, and is the only part of Das Kapital to be completed during Marx's life. It focuses on the aspect of capitalism that Marx refers to as the capitalist mode of production, or the way in which capitalism organizes society to produce goods and services. 

The first two parts of the work deal with the fundamentals of classical economics, including the nature of value, money, and commodities. In these sections, Marx defends and expands upon the labor theory of value as advanced by Adam Smith and David Ricardo. Starting with the next three parts, the focus of Volume I shifts to surplus value (the value of a finished commodity minus the cost of production), which he divides into absolute and relative forms. Marx argues that the relations of production specific to capitalism allow capital owners to accumulate more relative surplus value by material improvements to the means of production, thus driving the industrial revolution. However for Marx, not only does the extraction of surplus value motivate economic growth, it is also the source of class conflict between workers and the owners of capital. Parts Four, Five, and Six discuss how workers struggle with capital owners over control of the surplus value they produce, punctuated with examples of the horrors of wage slavery. Moreover, Marx argues that the drive to accumulate more capital creates contradictions within capitalism such as technological unemployment, various inefficiencies, and crises of overproduction. The penultimate part explains how capitalist systems sustain (or "reproduce") themselves once they have become established. Throughout the work, Marx places capitalism in a historically specific context, considering it not as an abstract ideal, but rather as the result of concrete historical developments. This is the special focus of the final part, which argues that capitalism initially develops not through the future capitalist class being more frugal and hard-working than the future working class (a process called primitive/previous/original accumulation by the pro-capitalist classical political economists, like Adam Smith), but through the violent expropriation of property by those that eventually (through that expropriation) become the capitalist class — hence the sarcastic title of the final part, "So-called Primitive Accumulation". 

In Volume I of Kapital, Marx makes use of a variety of logical, historical, literary, and other strategies to illustrate his points. His primary analytical tool is historical materialism, which applies the Hegelian method of immanent critique to the material basis of societies. As such, Volume I includes copious amounts of historical data and concrete examples from the industrial societies of the mid-nineteenth century, especially the United Kingdom. 

Within Marx's lifetime, he completed three editions of Volume I: the first two in German, the last in French. A third German edition, which was still in progress at the time of his death, was finished and published by Friedrich Engels in 1883. It is disputed among scholars whether the French or third German edition should be considered authoritative, as Marx presented his theories slightly differently in each one.

Book contents

Part One: Commodities and Money 
Chapters 1, 2 and 3 are a theoretical discussion of the commodity, value, exchange and the genesis of money. As Marx writes, "[b]eginnings are always difficult in all sciences. [...] [T]he section that contains the analysis of commodities, will, therefore present the greatest difficulty".  The modern reader is often perplexed about Marx going on about "one coat is equal to twenty yards of linen". Professor John Kenneth Galbraith reminds us that "the purchase of a coat by an average citizen was an action comparable in modern times to the purchase of an automobile or even a house".

Chapter 1: The Commodity

Section 1. The Two Factors of the Commodity 
Marx says a commodity is a use-value and also an exchange-value. He explains that as a use-value the commodity is something that meets a human want or need of any kind, i.e. it is a useful thing. The use-value of the commodity is determined by how useful the commodity is. However, the actual use-value is immeasurable. He explains that use-value can only be determined "in use or consumption". After determining the commodity as being a use-value, Marx explains that a commodity is also an exchange-value. He explains this as the quantity of other commodities that it will exchange for. Marx gives the example of corn and iron. No matter their relationship, there will always be an equation where a certain amount of corn will exchange for a certain amount of iron. He sets up this example to say that all commodities are in essence parallel in that they can always be exchanged for certain quantities of other commodities. He also explains that one cannot determine the exchange-value of the commodity simply by looking at it or examining its natural qualities. The exchange-value is not material, but it is instead a measure made by humans. In order to determine the exchange-value, one must see the commodity being exchanged with other commodities. Marx explains that while these two aspects of commodities are separate, at the same time they are also connected in that one cannot be discussed without the other. He explains that while the use-value of something can only change in quality, the exchange-value can only change in quantity.

Marx then goes on to explain that the exchange-value of a commodity is merely an expression of its value. Value is what connects all commodities so that they can all be exchanged with each other. The value of a commodity is determined by its socially necessary labour time, defined as "the labour time required to produce any use-value under the conditions of production, normal for a given society and with the average degree of skill and intensity of labour prevalent in that society". Therefore, Marx explains, the value of a commodity does not stay constant as it advances or it varies in labour productivity which may occur for many reasons. However, value does not mean anything unless it conjoins back to use-value. If a commodity is produced and no one wants it or it has no use, then "the labour does not count as labour" and therefore it has no value. He also says that one can produce use-value without being a commodity. If one produces something solely for his own benefit or need, he has produced use-value, but no commodity. Value can only be derived when the commodity has use-value for others. Marx calls this social use-value. He writes all of this to explain that all aspects of the commodity (use-value, exchange-value and value) are all separate from each other, but they are also essentially connected to each other.

Section 2. The Dual Character of the Labour Embodied in Commodities 
In this section, Marx discusses the relationship between labour and value. He states that if there is a change in the quantity of labour expended to produce an article, the value of the article will change. This is a direct correlation. Marx gives as an example the value of linen versus thread to explain the worth of each commodity in a capitalist society. Linen is hypothetically twice as valuable as thread because more socially necessary labour time was used to create it. Use-value of every commodity is produced by useful labour. Use-value measures the actual usefulness of a commodity whereas value is a measurement of exchange value. Objectively speaking, linen and thread have some value. Different forms of labour create different kinds of use-values. The value of the different use-values created by different types of labor can be compared because both are expenditures of human labour. One coat and 20 yards of linen take the same amount of socially necessary labour time to make so they have the same value. As we have expected in the production of the commodities, it lessen the capacity to create a high value of products.

Section 3. The Value-Form or Exchange-Value

(a) The Simple, Isolated, or Accidental Form of Value 
In this section, Marx explains that commodities come in double form, namely natural form and value-form. We do not know commodities' values until we know how much human labor was put in it. Commodities are traded for one another after their values are decided socially; then, there is value-relation which lets us trade between different kind of commodities. Marx explains value without using money. He uses 20 yards of linen and a coat to show the value of each other (20 yards of linen = 1 coat, or 20 yards of linen are worth 1 coat). The statement "20 yards of linen are worth 1 coat" label two forms of value. The first form, the relative form of value, is the commodity that comes first in the statement (the 20 yards of linen in the example). The second form, the equivalent form of value, is the commodity that comes second in the statement (the 1 coat in the example). He adds that comparing 20 yards of linen to itself (20 yards of linen = 20 yards of linen, or 20 yards of linen are worth 20 yards of linen) is meaningless because there is no expression of value. Linen is an object of utility whose value cannot be determined until it is compared to another commodity. Determining the value of a commodity depends on its position in the expression of comparative exchange value.

(b) The Total or Expanded Form of Value 
Marx begins this section with an equation for the expanded form of value in which "z commodity A = u commodity B or = v commodity C or = w commodity D or = x commodity E or = etc." and where the lower case letters (z, u, v, w, and x) represent quantities of a commodity and upper case letters (A, B, C, D, and E) represent specific commodities so that an example of this could be: "20 yards of linen = 1 coat or = 10 lb. tea or = 40 lb. coffee or = 1 quarter of corn or = 2 ounces of gold or =  ton of iron or = etc."  Marx explains that with this example of the expanded form of value the linen "is now expressed in terms of innumerable other members of the world of commodities. Every other commodity now becomes a mirror of linen's value". At this point, the particular use-value of linen becomes unimportant, but rather it is the magnitude of value (determined by socially necessary labor time) possessed in a quantity of linen which determines its exchange with other commodities. This chain of particular kinds (different commodities) of values is endless as it contains every commodity and changes constantly as new commodities come into being.

(c) The General Form of Value 
Marx begins this section with the table:

Marx then divides this subset of section 3 into three parts:

(d) The Money Form 

Here, Marx illustrates the shift to money form. Universal equivalent form or universal exchangeability has caused gold to take the place of linen in the socially accepted customs of exchange. Once it had reached a set value in the world of commodities, gold became the money commodity. Money form is distinct from sections A, B, and C.

Now that gold has a relative value against a commodity (such as linen), it can attain price form as Marx states:

This illustrates the application of price form as a universal equivalent. Marx concludes this section by pointing out that "the simple commodity-form is therefore the germ of the money-form". The simplified application of this idea is then illustrated as such:

Section 4. The Fetishism of the Commodity and Its Secret 
Marx's inquiry in this section focuses on the nature of the commodity, apart from its basic use-value. In other words, why does the commodity appear to have an exchange-value as if it was an intrinsic characteristic of the commodity instead of a measurement of the homogenous human labor spent to create the commodity? Marx explains that this sort of fetishism, which he attributes to a thing a characteristic when it is actually a social product, originates in the fact that under a commodity based society the social labour, the social relations between producers and their mutual interdependence, solely manifest in the market in the process of exchange. Therefore, the value of the commodity is determined independently from private producers so it seems that it is the market which determines the value apparently based on a characteristic of the commodity; it seems as if there are relations between commodities instead of relations between producers.

Marx also explains that due to the historical circumstances of capitalist society the values of commodities are usually studied by political economists in their most advanced form, i.e. money. These economists see the value of the commodity as something metaphysically autonomous from the social labor that is the actual determinant of value. Marx calls this fetishism—the process whereby the society that originally generated an idea eventually and through the distance of time forgets that the idea is actually a social and therefore all-too-human product. This society will no longer look beneath the veneer of the idea (in this case the value of commodities) as it currently exists. The society will simply take the idea as a natural and/or God-given inevitability that they are powerless to alter it.

Marx compares this fetishism to the manufacturing of religious belief. He argues that people initially create a deity to fulfill whatever desire or need they have in present circumstances, but then these products of the human brain appear as autonomous figures endowed with a life of their own and enter into a relations both with each other and with the human race. Similarly, commodities only enter into relation with each other through exchange which is a purely social phenomenon. Before that, they are simply useful items, but not commodities. Value itself cannot come from use-value because there is no way to compare the usefulness of an item; there are simply too many potential functions.

Once in exchange, commodities' values are determined by the amount of socially useful labor-time put into them because labor can be generalized. For example, it takes longer to mine diamonds than it does to dig quartz, therefore diamonds are worth more. Fetishism within capitalism occurs once labor has been socially divided and centrally coordinated and the worker no longer owns the means of production. They no longer have access to the knowledge of how much labor went into a product because they no longer control its distribution. The only obvious determinant of value remaining to the mass of people is the value that was assigned in the past. Thus, the value of a commodity seems to arise from a mystical property inherent to it, rather than from labor-time, the actual determinant of value.

Chapter 2: Exchange 
In this chapter, Marx explains the social and private characteristics of the process of exchange. According to Marx, owners of commodities must recognize one another as owners of commodities which embody value. He explains exchange not merely as a swapping of items, but as a contract between the two. It is this exchange which also allows the commodity in question to realize its exchange value and he explains that the realization of exchange value always precedes that of use value because one must obtain the item in question before its actual utility is realized. Furthermore, Marx explains that the use value in question can only be realized by he who purchases the commodity whereas he who is selling a commodity must find no utility in the item, save the utility of its exchange value. Marx concludes the chapter with an abstraction about the necessitated advent of money wherever exchange takes place, starting between nations and gradually becoming more and more domestic. This money form which arises out of the necessity of liquidating exchange becomes the universal equivalent form which is set aside from all commodities as a mere measure of value, creating a money-commodities dualism.

Chapter 3: Money, or the Circulation of Commodities

Section 1. The Measure of Values

(a) Functions of Metallic Money 
In this chapter, Marx examines the functions of money commodities. According to Marx, the main function of money is to provide commodities with the medium for the expression of their values, i.e. labor time. The function of money as a measure of value serves only in an imaginary or ideal capacity. That is, the money that performs the functions of a measure of value is only imaginary because it is society that has given the money its value. For example, the value of one ton of iron is expressed by an imaginary quantity of the money commodity which contains the same amount of labor as the iron.

(b) Multiple Forms of Metallic Money 
As a measure of value and a standard of price, money performs two functions. First, it is the measure of value as the social incarnation of human labour. Second, it serves as a standard of price as a quantity of metal with a fixed weight. As in any case, where quantities of the same denomination are to be measured the stability of the measurement is of the utmost importance. Hence, the less the unit of measurement is subject to variations, the better it fulfills its role. Metallic currency can only serve as a measure of value because it is itself a product of human labour.

Commodities with definite prices appear in this form: a commodity A = x gold; b commodity B = y gold; c commodity C = z gold, etc., where a, b, c represent definite quantities of the commodities A, B, C and x, y, z definite quantities of gold.

In spite of the varieties of commodities, their values become magnitudes of the same denomination, namely gold-magnitudes. Since these commodities are all magnitudes of gold, they are comparable and interchangeable.

(c) Price 
Price is the money-name of the labor objectified in a commodity. Like the relative form of value in general, price expresses the value of a commodity by asserting that a given quantity of the equivalent is directly interchangeable. The price form implies both the exchangeability of commodities for money and the necessity of exchange. Gold serves as an ideal measure of value only because it has already established itself as the money commodity in the process of exchange.

Section 2. The Means of Circulation

(a) The Metamorphosis of Commodities 
In this section, Marx further examines the paradoxical nature of the exchange of commodities. The contradictions that exist within the process of exchange provide the structure for social metabolism. The process of social metabolism "transfers commodities from hands in which they are non-use-values to hands in which they are use-values". Commodities can only exist as values for a seller and use-values for a buyer. In order for a commodity to be both a value and a use-value, it must be produced for exchange. The process of exchange alienates the ordinary commodity when its antithesis (the money commodity) becomes involved.  During exchange, the money commodity confronts the ordinary commodity disguising the true form of the ordinary commodity. Commodities as use-values and money as exchange-value are now on the opposite poles and exist as separate entities. In practice, gold or money functions as exchange-value while commodities function as use-values in the process of exchange. A commodity's existence is only validated through the form of money and money is only validated through the form of a commodity. This dualistic phenomenon involving money and commodities is directly related to Marx's concept of use-value and value.

 Commodity-Money-Commodity
 
Marx examines the two metamorphoses of the commodity through sale and purchase.  In this process, "as far as concerns its material content, the movement is C-C, the exchange of one commodity for another, the metabolic interaction of social labor, in whose result the process itself becomes extinguished".

 First metamorphosis of the commodity, or sale
 
In the process of sale, the value of a commodity which is measured by socially necessary labor-time is then measured by the universal equivalent, i.e. gold.

 The second or concluding metamorphosis of the commodity purchase
 
Through the process of purchase, all commodities lose their form by the universal alienator, i.e. money. Marx states that since "every commodity disappears when it becomes money", it is "impossible to tell from the money itself how it got into the hands of its possessor, or what article has been changed into it".

A purchase represents a sale, although they are two separate transformations. This process allows for the movement of commodities and the circulation of money.

(b) The Circulation of Money 
The circulation of money is first initiated by the transformation of a commodity into money. The commodity is taken from its natural state and transformed into its monetary state. When this happens, the commodity "falls out of circulation into consumption". The previous commodity now in its monetary form replaces a new and different commodity continuing the circulation of money. In this process, money is the means for the movement and circulation of commodities. Money assumes the measure of value of a commodity, i.e. the socially necessary labor-time. The repetition of this process constantly removes commodities from their starting places, taking them out of the sphere of circulation. Money circulates in the sphere and fluctuates with the sum of all the commodities that co-exist within the sphere. The price of commodities, and thus the quantity of money in circulation, varies by three factors, namely "the movement of prices, the quantity of commodities in circulation, and the velocity of circulation of money".

(c) Coin and the Symbol of Value 
Money takes the shape of a coin because of how it behaves in the sphere of circulation. Gold became the universal equivalent by the measurement of its weight in relation to commodities. This process was a job that belonged to the state. The problem with gold was that it wore down as it circulated from hand to hand so the state introduced new circulating media such as silver, copper and inconvertible paper money issued by the state itself as a representation of gold. Marx views money as a "symbolic existence" which haunts the sphere of circulation and arbitrarily measures the product of labor.

Section 3. Money

(a) Hoarding 
The exchange of money is a continuous flow of sales and purchase. Marx writes that "[i]n order to be able to buy without selling, [one] must have previously sold without buying". This simple illustration demonstrates the essence of hoarding. In order to potentially buy without selling a commodity in your possession, you must have hoarded some degree of money in the past. Money becomes greatly desired due to potential purchasing power. If one has money, one can exchange it for commodities and vice versa. However, while satisfying this newly arisen fetish for gold, the hoard causes the hoarder to make personal sacrifices and explains its amorality "doing away all distinctions" by citing Timon of Athens by William Shakespeare.

(b) Means of Payment 
In this section, Marx analyzes the relationship between debtor and creditor and exemplifies the idea of the transfer of debt. In relation to this, Marx discusses how the money-form has become a means of incremental payment for a service or purchase. He states that the "function of money as means of payment begins to spread out beyond the sphere of circulation of commodities. It becomes the universal material of contracts". Due to fixed payments and the like, debtors are forced to hoard money in preparation for these dates as Marx states: "While hoarding, as a distinct mode of acquiring riches, vanishes with the progress of civil society, the formation of reserves of the means of payment grows with that progress".

(c) World Money 
Countries have reserves of gold and silver for two purposes: (1) home circulation and (2) external circulation in world markets. Marx says that it is essential for countries to hoard as money is needed "as the medium of the home circulation and home payments, and in part out of its function of money of the world". Accounting for this hoarding in the context of hoarded money's inability to contribute to the growth of a capitalist society, Marx states that banks are the relief to this problem:

Part Two: The Transformation of Money into Capital 
In part two, Marx explains the three components necessary to create capital through the process of circulation. The first section of Part II, Chapter 4 explains the general formula for capital; Chapter 5 delves further by explaining the contradictions of the general formula; and the last section of Part II, Chapter 6 describes the sale and purchase of labor power within the general formula.

As described by Marx, money can only be transformed into capital through the circulation of commodities. Money originates not as capital, but only as means of exchange. Money becomes capital when it is used as a standard for exchange. The circulation of commodities has two forms that make up the general formula, namely C-M-C and M-C-M. C-M-C represents the process of first selling a commodity for money (C-M) and then using that money to buy another commodity (M-C), or as Marx states, "selling in order to buy". M-C-M describes transacting money for a commodity (M-C) and then selling the commodity for more capital, (C-M).

The largest distinction between the two forms appears through the result of each. During C-M-C, a commodity sold will be replaced by a commodity bought.  In this form, money only acts as a means of exchange. The transaction ends there, with the exchange of use-values and according to Marx the money has "been spent once and for all". The C-M-C form facilitates the exchange of one use-value for another. On the contrary, money is essentially exchanged for more money during M-C-M. The person who invested money into a commodity sells it for money. The money returns to the initial starting place so the money is not spent as in the C-M-C form of exchange, but it is instead advanced. The only function of this process lies in its ability to valorize. By withdrawing more money from circulation than the amount put in, money can be reinvested in circulation creating repeated accumulation of monetary wealth—a never ending process. Thus, M-C-M' becomes the objective of M-C-M. M' stands for the money returned in the circulative process (M) plus the additional surplus value gained (M∆): M'=M+M∆. Capital can only be created once the process of M-C-M has been completed and money returns to the starting point to be re-entered into circulation.

Marx points out that "in its pure form, the exchange of commodities is an exchange of equivalents, and thus it is not a method of increasing value" and so a contradiction reveals itself. If the participating individuals exchanged equal values, neither of the individuals would increase capital. The needs being satisfied would be the only gain. The creation of surplus-value then becomes rather peculiar for Marx because commodities, in accordance with socially assigned necessary values, should not create surplus-value if traded fairly.  Marx investigates the matter and concludes that "surplus-value cannot arise from circulation, and therefore that, for it to be formed, something must take place in the background which is not visible in the circulation itself". According to Marx, labor determines the value of a commodity. Through the example of a piece of leather, Marx then describes how humans can increase the value of a commodity through the means of labor. Turning the leather into boots increases the value of the leather because now more labor has been applied to the leather. Marx then explains the contradiction of the general formula. Capital cannot be created from circulation because equal exchange of commodities creates no surplus value and unequal exchange of commodities changes the distribution of wealth, but it still does not produce surplus-value. Capital cannot be created without circulation either because labor creates value within the general formula. Thus, Marx writes that "[i]t must have its origin both in circulation and not in circulation". However, a "double result" remains, namely that the capitalist must buy commodities at their value, sell them at their value and yet conclude the process with more money than at the beginning. The profit seemingly originates both inside and outside the general formula.

The intricacies of the general formula relate to the role of labor-power 
In the last section of part two, Marx investigates labor-power as a commodity. Labor-power existing on the market depends on two fulfillments, namely that the workers must offer it for temporary sale on the market and the workers must not possess the means to their own subsistence. As long as the labor-power is sold temporarily, then the worker is not considered a slave. Worker dependence for a means of subsistence ensures a large working force, necessary for the production of capital. The value of labor bought on the market as a commodity represents the definite amount of socially necessary labor objectified in the worker, or according to Marx, "the labor-time necessary for the production [of the worker]" which means the food, education, shelter, health, etc. required to create and maintain a worker. The capitalists need workers to combine with their means of production to create a sell-able commodity and workers need capitalists to provide a wage that pays for a means of subsistence. Within the capitalist mode of production, it is custom to pay for labor-power only after it has been exercised over a period of time, fixed by a contract (i.e. the work week).

Part Three: The Production of Absolute Surplus-Value 
In part three, Marx explores the production of absolute surplus value.  To understand this, one must first understand the labor process itself. According to Marx, the production of absolute surplus value arises directly out of the labor process.

There are two sides to the labor process. On one side, there is the buyer of labor power, or the capitalist. On the other side, there is the worker. For the capitalist, the worker possesses only one use-value, namely that of labor power. The capitalist buys from the worker his labor power, or his ability to do work. In return, the worker receives a wage, or a means of subsistence.

Marx says this of the labor process: "In the labor process, therefore, man's activity, via the instruments of labor, effects an alteration in the object of labor. [...] The product of the process is a use-value, a piece of natural material adapted to human needs by means of change in its form. Labor has become bound up in its object: labor has been objectified, the object has been worked on". The labor that the worker has put forth to produce the object has been transferred to the object, thus giving it value.

Under capitalism, it is the capitalist who owns everything in the production process such as the raw materials that the commodity is made of, the means of production and the labor power (worker) itself.  At the end of the labor process, it is the capitalist who owns the product of their labor, not the workers who produced the commodities. Since the capitalist owns everything in the production process, he is free to sell it for his own profit.  The capitalist wants to produce "[a]n article destined to be sold, a commodity; and secondly he wants to produce a commodity greater in value than the sum of the values of the commodities used to produce it, namely the means of production and the labor-power he purchased with his good money on the open market. His aim is to produce not only a use-value, but a commodity; not only use-value, but value; and not just value, but also surplus value".

The goal of the capitalist is to produce surplus value. However, producing surplus value proves to be difficult. If all goods are purchased at their full price, then profit cannot be made. Surplus value cannot arise from buying the inputs of production at a low price and then selling the commodity at a higher price. This is due to the economic law of one price which states "that if trade were free, then identical goods should sell for about the same price throughout the world". What this law means is that profit cannot be made simply through the purchase and sale of goods. Price changes on the open market will force other capitalists to adjust their prices in order to be more competitive, resulting in one price.

Thus, where does surplus value originate? Quite simply, the origin of surplus value arises from the worker. To better understand how this happens, consider the following example from Marx's Capital, Volume I. A capitalist hires a worker to spin ten pounds of cotton into yarn. Suppose the value of the cotton is one dollar per pound. The entire value of the cotton is 10 dollars. The production process naturally causes wear and tear on the machinery that is used to help produce the yarn. Suppose this wearing down of machinery costs the capitalist two dollars. The value of labor power is three dollars per day. Now also suppose that the working day is six hours. In this example, the production process yields up 15 dollars and also costs the capitalist 15 dollars, therefore there is no profit.

Now consider the process again, but this time the working day is 12 hours. In this case, there is 20 dollars produced from the 20 pounds of cotton. Wear and tear on machinery now costs the capitalist four dollars. However, the value of labor power is still only three dollars per day. The entire production process costs the capitalist 27 dollars. However, the capitalist can now sell the yarn for 30 dollars. This is because the yarn still holds 12 hours of socially necessary labor time in it (equivalent to six dollars).

The key to this is that workers exchange their labor power in return for a means of subsistence. In this example, the means of subsistence has not changed, therefore the wage is still only 3 dollars per day. Notice that while the labor only costs the capitalist 3 dollars, the labor power produces 12 hours worth of socially necessary labor time. The secret of surplus value resides in the fact that there is a difference between the value of labor power and what that labor power can produce in a given amount of time. Labor power can produce more than its own value.

By working on materials during the production process, the worker both preserves the value of the material and adds new value to the material. This value is added because of the labor that is necessary to transform the raw material into a commodity. According to Marx, value only exists in use-values, so how does the worker transfer value to a good? It is because "[m]an himself, viewed merely as the physical existence of labor power, is a natural object, a thing, although a living, conscious thing, and labor is the physical manifestation of that power". In order for commodities to be produced with surplus value, two things must be true. Man must be a living commodity, a commodity that produces labor power; and it must be the nature of this labor power to produce more than its own value.

When capitalists begin production, they initially spend their money on two inputs. These inputs can be represented with the capital advanced equation: ; where C is capital advanced, c is constant capital and v is variable capital.  Constant capital is nothing more than the means of production (factories, machinery, raw materials, etc.).  Constant capital has a fixed value which can be transferred to the commodity, although the value added to the commodity can never be more than the value of constant capital itself. The source of surplus value comes instead from variable capital or labor power. Labor power is the only commodity capable of producing more value than it possesses.

The accumulation of capital occurs after the production process is completed. The equation for the accumulation of capital is '.  Here, C' is the value created during the production process. C' is equal to constant capital plus variable capital plus some extra amount of surplus value (s) which arises out of variable capital. Marx says that surplus value is "merely a congealed quantity of surplus labor-time [...], nothing but objectified surplus labor".

To better understand the rate of surplus value, one must understand that there are two parts to the working day. One part of the working day is the time necessary in order to produce the value of the workers labor power. The second part of the working day is surplus labor time which produces no value for the laborer, but produces value for the capitalist. The rate of surplus value is a ratio of surplus labor time (s) to necessary labor time (v). The rate of surplus value (s/v) is also referred to by Marx as the rate of exploitation.

Capitalists often maximize profits by manipulating the rate of surplus value which can be done through the increase of surplus labor time. This method is referred to as the production of absolute surplus value. In this case, capitalists merely increase the length of the working day. Although there are physical restrictions to the working day such as general human needs, the working day is by no means fixed. This allows for great flexibility in the number of hours worked per day.
 
This flexibility in working hours leads to a class struggle between capitalist and worker. The capitalist argues that they have the right to extract all of the value from a day's labor since that is what they bought. By contrast, the worker demands a limited working day. The worker needs to be able to renew his labor power so that it can be sold again anew. The capitalist sees working fewer hours as theft from capital and the worker see working too many hours as theft from laborers. This class struggle can be seen throughout history and eventually laws such as Factory Acts were put in place to limit the length of a working day and child labour. This forced capitalists to find a new way in which to exploit workers.

Part Four: The Production of Relative Surplus-Value 
Part four of Capital, Volume I consists of four chapters:
 12: The Concept of Relative Surplus-Value
 13: Co-operation
 14: Division of Labour and Manufacture
 15: Machinery and Modern Industry.

In Chapter 12, Marx explains a decrease in the value of labour power by increasing production. Chapters 13–15 examine ways in which the productivity of this labour is increased.

Chapter 12: The Concept of Relative Surplus-Value 
 A – – – – – – – – – – B – – C
The section from A to B represents the necessary labour and the section from B to C represents the surplus labour. Remember, the value of labour-power is "the labour-time necessary to produce labour-power". What is of interest to Marx is "[h]ow can the production of surplus-value be increased, i.e. how can surplus labour be prolonged, without any prolongation, or independently of any prolongation, of the line AC?" Marx says it is in the best interest of the capitalist to divide the working day like this:
 A – – – – – – – – – B' – B – – C

This is showing that the amount of surplus labour is increased while the amount of necessary labour is decreased. Marx calls this decrease in necessary labour and increase in surplus value as relative surplus-value whereas when there is an actual lengthening in the working day and surplus value is produced, this is called absolute surplus-value. For this to happen, the productivity of labour must increase. According to Marx, the perpetual drive of capital is to increase the productivity of labor, leading to a decrease in the value of commodities. In this, the value of the worker's means of subsistence decreases, resulting in a decrease in the value of her labour power.

Chapter 13: Co-operation 
According to Marx, co-operation happens "when numerous workers work together side by side in accordance with a plan, whether in the same process, or in different but connected processes". Co-operation also shortens the time needed to complete a given task. Marx says that "[i]f the labour process is complicated, then the sheer number of the co-operators permits the apportionment of various operations to different hands, and consequently their simultaneous performance.  The time necessary for the completion of the whole work is thereby shortened". The effort by the capitalist to organize co-operation is simply for reasons of increasing production. While this is the case, Marx is quick to note that the collective powers of co-operation are not created by capital. According to Marx, this is a disguise or a fetish. He cites the building of the pyramids which occurred prior to the organization of a capitalist mode of production.

Chapter 14: The Division of Labour and Manufacture

Section 1. The Dual Origin of Manufacture 
In this section, Marx examines manufacture as a method of production involving specialized workers, or craftsmen, working on their own detailed task. He cites the assembly of a carriage as an example of the first way this is brought about. In this, multiple skilled workers are brought together to produce specialized parts once unique to their craft, contributing to the overall production of the commodity. Another way this manufacture arises is by splitting up a single handicraft into multiple specialized areas, further introducing a division of labour.

Section 2. The Specialized Worker and his Tools 
In this section, Marx argues that a worker who performs only one task throughout his life will perform his job at a faster and more productive rate, forcing capital to favor the specialized worker to the traditional craftsman. He also states that a specialized worker doing only one task can use a more specialized tool, which cannot do many jobs yet can do the one job well, in a more efficient manner than a traditional craftsman using a multi-purpose tool on any specific task.

Section 3. The Two Fundamental Forms of Manufacture: Heterogeneous and Organic 
In this section, Marx argues that a division of labour within production produces a hierarchy of labor, skilled and unskilled and also a variation in wages. Yet according to Marx, this division within the labour process reduces a workers skills collectively which devalues their labour power.

Section 4. The Division of Labour in Manufacture and the Division of Labour in Society 
In this section, Marx states that division of labour has existed in society long before the establishment of a capitalist mode of production. He argues that despite its existence prior to capital, division of labor is unique under capital because its goal is to increase the rate and mass of surplus value, not create a "combined product of specialized labours".

Section 5. The Capitalist Character of Division 
In this section, Marx discusses an increased class struggle that is brought about by capital, or in this case in the division of labour. By creating such a division, it disguises the efforts and work of such a division as that of the capitalist. According to Marx, division of labour is a subdivision of a workers potential and sets limitations on his mental and physical capacity, making him reliant upon the capitalist to exercise his specialized skill.

Chapter 15: Machinery and Large-Scale Industry

Section 1. Development of Machinery 
In this section, Marx explains the significance of machinery to capitalists and how it is applied to the workforce. The goal of introducing machinery into the workforce is to increase productivity. When productivity is increased, the commodity being produced is cheapened. Relative surplus value is amplified because machinery shortens the part of the day that the worker works for his or her means of subsistence and increases the time that the worker produces for the capitalist.

Marx discusses tools and machines and their application to the process of production. Marx claims that many experts, including himself, cannot distinguish between tools and machines. He states that they "call a tool a simple machine and a machine a complex tool". Marx continues to elaborate on this misinterpretation of definition, explaining that some people distinguish between a tool and a machine "by saying that in the case of the tool, man is the motive power, whereas the power behind the machine is a natural force independent of man, for instance an animal, water, wind and so on". Marx explains a flaw with this approach comparing two examples. He points out that a plow which is powered by an animal would be considered to be a machine and Claussen's circular loom which is able to weave at a tremendous speed is in fact powered by one worker and therefore considered to be a tool. Marx gives a precise definition of the machine when he says that "[t]he machine, therefore, is a mechanism that, after being set in motion, performs with its tools the same operation as the worker formerly did with similar tools. Whether the motive power is derived from man, or in turn from a machine, makes no difference here".

There are three parts to fully developed machinery:
 The motor mechanism powers the mechanism. Be it a steam engine, water wheel or a person's caloric engine.
 The transmitting mechanism, wheels, screws and ramps and pulleys. These are the moving parts of the machine.
 The working machine uses itself to sculpt whatever it was built to do.

Marx believes the working machine is the most important part of developed machinery. It is in fact what began the industrial revolution of the 18th century and even today it continues to turn craft into industry.

The machine is able to replace a worker, who works at one specific job with one tool, with a mechanism that accomplishes the same task, but with many similar tools and at a much faster rate. One machine doing one specific task soon turns into a fleet of co-operating machines accomplishing the entire process of production. This aspect of automation enables the capitalist to replace large numbers of human workers with machines which creates a large pool of available workers that the capitalist can choose from to form his human workforce. The worker no longer needs to be skilled in a particular trade because their job has been reduced to oversight and maintenance of their mechanical successors.

The development of machinery is an interesting cycle where inventors started inventing machines to complete necessary tasks. The machine making industry grew larger and worker's efforts started focusing toward creating these machines, the objects which steal work from its own creator. With so many machines being developed, the need for new machines to create old machines increased. For example, the spinning machine started a need for printing and dyeing and the designing of the cotton gin. Marx states that "[w]ithout steam engines, the hydraulic press could not have been made. Along with the press, came the mechanical lathe and an iron cutting machine. Labor assumes a material mode of existence which necessitates the replacement of human force by natural forces".

Section 2. The Value Transferred by Machinery to the Product 
As seen in the previous section, the machine does not replace the tool which is powered by man. The tool multiplies and expands into the working machine that is created by man. Workers now go to work not to handle the tools of production, but to work with the machine which handles the tools. It is clear that large-scale industry increase the productivity of labor to an extraordinary degree by incorporating its fast-paced efficiency within the process of production. What is not as clear is that this new increase in productivity does not require an equal increase in expended labor by the worker. Machinery creates no new value. The machine accumulates value from the labor which went into producing it and it merely transfers its value into the product it is producing until its value is used up.

Only labor power which is bought by capitalists can create new value. Machinery transfers its value into the product at a rate which is dependent upon how much the total value of the machinery is, with Marx stating: "The less value it gives up, the more productive it is, and the more its services approach those rendered by natural forces". The general rule of machinery is that the labor used to create it must be less than how much human work it replaces when it is used in the process of production. Otherwise, the machinery would not be effective in raising surplus value and instead depreciate it.  This is why some machinery is not chosen to replace actual human workers as it would not be cost effective.

Section 3. The Proximate Effects of Machinery on the Workman 
Section three examines some of the effects of the industrial revolution on the individual worker. It is divided into three subsections, the first of which discusses how the use of industrial equipment enables capitalists to appropriate supplementary labor. Marx notes that since machinery can reduce the reliance upon a worker's physical strength, it enables the employment of women and children to carry out work that could previously only be done by men. Thus, it depreciates an individual's labour-power by introducing many more potential workers into the exploitable pool of laborers.

The second subsection describes how mechanisation can effectively shorten the working-time needed to produce an individual commodity item by increasing labor productivity. However, because of the need to recoup the capital outlay required to introduce a given machine, it must be productively operated for as long as possible every day.

In the third subsection, Marx discusses how mechanization influences the intensification of labor. Although the introduction of the Factory Acts limited the allowable length of the work day, it did nothing to halt the drive for more efficiency. Control over workers' tools is transferred to the machine which prevents them from setting their own work pace and rhythm. As the machines are continuously adapted and streamlined, the effect is an ever-increasing intensification of the laborer's work activity.

Section 4. The Factory 
Marx begins this section with two descriptions of the factory as a whole:

This twofold description shows the characteristics of the relationship between the collective body of labor power and the machine. In the first description, the workers, or collective labor power, are viewed as separate entities from the machine. In the second description, the machine is the dominant force, with the collective labor acting as mere appendages of the self operating machine. Marx uses the latter description to display the characteristics of the modern factory system under capitalism.

In the factory, the tools of the worker disappear and the worker's skill is passed on to the machine. The division of labor and specialization of skills re-appear in the factory, only now as a more exploitative form of capitalist production (work is still organized into co-operative groups). Work in the factory usually consists of two groups, people who are employed on the machines and those who attend to the machines. The third group outside of the factory is a superior class of workers, trained in the maintenance and repair of the machines.

Factory work begins at childhood to ensure that a person may adapt to the systematic movements of the automated machine, therefore increasing productivity for the capitalist. Marx describes this work as being extremely exhausting to the nervous system and void of intellectual activity. Factory work robs workers of basic working conditions like clean air, light, space and protection. Marx ends this section by asking if Charles Fourier was wrong when he called factories mitigated jails.

Section 5. The Struggle between Worker and Machine 
This section opens with a historical summary of workers' revolts against the imposition of mechanical instruments of production such as ribbon weaving. Marx notes that by the early 19th century the introduction of power looms and other manufacturing equipment resulted in widespread destruction of machinery by the Luddite movement. These attacks in turn gave the government at the time a pretext for severe crackdowns. Marx argues that "[i]t took both time and experience before workers learned to distinguish between machinery and their employment by capital, and therefore to transfer their attacks from the material instruments of production to the form of society which utilizes those instruments".

Marx describes the machine as the instrument of labor for the capitalists' material mode of existence. The machine competes with the worker, diminishing the use-value of the worker's labor-power. Marx also points out that the advance in technology of machines led to the substitution of less skilled work for more skilled work which ultimately led to a change in wages. During the progression of machinery, the numbers of skilled workers decreased while child labor flourished, increasing profits for the capitalist.

Section 6. The Compensation Theory, With Regard to the Workers Displaced by Machinery 
In this section, Marx sets forth to illuminate the error within the compensation theory of the political economists. According to this theory, the displacement of workers by machinery will necessarily set free an equal stable, amount of variable capital previously used for the purchase of labour-power and remains available for the same purpose. However, Marx argues that the introduction of machinery is simply a shift of variable capital to constant capital. The capital set free cannot be used for compensation since the displacement of variable capital available becomes embodied in the machinery purchased.

The capital that may become available for the compensation will always be less than the total amount of capital previously used to purchase labor-power before the addition of machinery. Furthermore, the remainder of variable capital available is directed towards hiring workers with the expertise skills to operate new machinery. Therefore, the conversion of the greater part of the total capital is now used as constant capital, a reduction of variable capital necessarily follows. As a result of machinery, displaced workers are not so quickly compensated by employment in other industries, but they instead are forced into an expanding labor-market at a disadvantage and available for greater capitalist exploitation without the ability to procure the means of subsistence for survival.

Marx also argues that the introduction of machinery may increase employment in other industries, yet this expansion "has nothing in common with the so-called theory of compensation". Greater productivity will necessarily generate an expansion of production into peripheral fields that provide raw materials. Conversely, machinery introduced to industries that produce raw materials will lead to an increase in those industries that consume them. The production of greater surplus-value leads to greater wealth of the ruling classes, an increase in the labor-market and consequently the establishment of new industries. As such, Marx cites the growth of the domestic service industry equated to greater servitude by the exploited classes.

Section 7. Repulsion and Attraction of Workers Through The Development of Machine Production, Crises in the Cotton Industry 
The political economist apology for the displacement of workers by machinery asserts that there is a corresponding increase in employment. Marx is quick to cite the example of the silk industry in which an actual decrease of employment appears simultaneously with an increase of existing machinery. On the other hand, an increase in the number of factory workers employed is the result of "the gradual annexation of neighboring branches of industry" and "the building of more factories or the extension of old factories in a given industry".

Furthermore, Marx argues that an increase in factory workers is relative since the displacement of workers creates a proportionately wider gap between the increase of machinery and a proportionate decrease of labor required to operate that machinery.  The constant expansion of capitalism and ensuing technical advances leads to extension of markets until it reaches all corners of the globe, thus creating cycles of economic prosperity and crisis. Finally, the "repulsion and attraction" of workers results as a cycle in which there is a constant displacement of workers by machinery which necessarily leads to increased productivity followed by a relative expansion of industry and higher employment of labour. This sequence renews itself as all components of the cycle lead to novel technological innovation for "replacing labour-power".

Part Five: The Production of Absolute and Relative Surplus-Value 
In Chapters 16–18, Marx examines how the capitalist strategies for the production of both absolute and relative surplus-value are combined and can function simultaneously.

Chapter 16: The Rise of Surplus Value 
Marx describes the process of taking the worker's individual productive actions and making them a collective effort of many workers. This action takes the worker further away from the actual production of the commodity and then allows the capitalist to use the worker only to create surplus value. The surplus value is increased first through absolute methods such as extending the work day and then through relative methods such as increasing worker productivity. These actions are the general foundations of capitalism as described by Marx.

The worker's transformation from producer of commodities for use in survival to producer of surplus value is necessary in the progression to capitalism. In production outside the capitalist system, the worker produces everything they need to survive. When the worker moves beyond producing what they need to survive, they can provide their work for a wage and create part of some product in return for a wage to buy what they need to survive. Capitalism takes advantage of this extra time by paying the worker a wage that allows them to survive, but it is less than the value the same worker creates. Through large scale manufacturing and economies of scale, the workers are placed progressively further away from manufacturing products themselves and only function as part of a whole collective that creates the commodities. This changes the concept of productive labor from the production of commodities to the production of surplus value.  The worker is only productive to the capitalist if they can maximize the surplus value the capitalist is earning.

Not simply content with the transformation of the worker from a creator of commodities to creator of surplus value, capitalist must devise new ways to increase the surplus that he is receiving. The first, or absolute, way the capitalist can increase surplus value is through the prolongation of the working day so the worker has more time to create value. The second, or relative, way the capitalist can increase surplus value is to revolutionize changes in the production method. If the worker can only produce the means for himself in the time he works during the day, there would be no extra time for him to create surplus value for the capitalist. The capitalist must then either enable the worker to complete the paid work time more quickly through relative means, or he must increase the work day in absolute terms. Without enabling unpaid work to exist, the capitalist system would not be able to sustain itself.

With surplus labor resting on a natural basis, there are no natural obstacles preventing one man from imposing his labor burden on another. As a worker looks into the possible options of getting out of capitalist exploitation or the initial "animal condition", one of the obvious options is becoming a capitalist himself. This is called socialized labor which exists when the surplus labor of one worker becomes necessary for the existence of another.

Marx mentions two natural conditions of wealth that are helpful in understanding the progression of socialized labor over time. The two conditions are natural wealth in the means of subsistence and natural wealth in the instruments of labor. Over time, society has moved more from the former to the latter. It was not that long ago that the majority of society produced for themselves and did not have to be concerned about producing surplus labor for others. We did labor for others, but it was not in effort to create surplus value; it was to help others.

Marx uses the Egyptians as an example to illustrate a society's potential when there is extra time that does not have to be used toward creating surplus value. The Egyptians lived in a very fertile land (natural subsistence wealth) so they could raise children at a very low cost. This is the main reason why the population grew so large. One might think all the great Egyptian structures were possible because of the large population, but it is due to the availability of labor time.

In regards to capitalism, you might think that a greater natural wealth of subsistence would result in greater growth and capitalist production (like the Egyptians), but that is not the case. So why is capitalism so strong in many countries that do not have excess natural resources? The answer is the necessity of bringing a natural force under the control of society (irrigation in Persia and India, flow of water in Egypt, etc.), As Marx says, "favourable conditions provide the possibility, not the reality of surplus labour".

Marx displays an example of surplus labor occurring in these favorable conditions in the case of the East Indies. The inhabitants would be able to produce enough to satisfy all of his needs with only twelve working hours per week. This provides for more than enough leisure time until capitalist production takes hold. He may be required to work six days per week to satisfy his needs—there can be no explanation of why it is necessary for him to provide the extra five days of surplus labor.

Marx then critiques famed economist David Ricardo and the lack of addressing the issue of surplus-value. Ricardo does not take the time to discuss the origin of surplus-value and sidestepped the entire issue altogether. Agreeing with classical economists, John Stuart Mill finds that the productive power, or surplus value, is the source of profits, but he adds that the necessities of life take less time to produce than is required by society. Therefore, this becomes the reason capital will realize a profit. Mill goes on to assert that profit can only be gleaned from productive power and not exchange which falls in line with Marx's theories.

The next critique of Mill goes on to the percentage that is gained from the laborer. Marx finds it to be "absolutely false" in the fact that the percentage of surplus labor will always be more than the profits. This is due to the amount of capital invested. Following his conclusions, Marx calls Mill's ideas an optical illusion as he looks into the advancing of capital. Mill looks at laborers and considers them to be a form of capitalist—they are advancing the capitalist their labor ahead of time and receiving it at the end of the project for more of a share. Marx hits the idea out with the analogy of the American peasant being his own slave as he is doing forced labor for himself.

Marx examined surplus value and showed it to be a necessity in capitalism. This surplus value is derived from the difference between the value the worker creates and the wage he earns. Chapter 16 looked into the ways in which the capitalist is able to increase surplus-value and takes a direct attack against economists Ricardo and Mill.

Chapter 17: Changes of Magnitude in the price of Labor-Power and in Surplus-Value 
The value of labor power, also known as wage, is the first thing that Marx begins to re-explain in the opening of the chapter, stressing that it is equal to the quantity of the "necessaries of life habitually required by the average laborer". By re-stressing the importance of this concept, Marx is building a foundation on which he can begin to elaborate his argument on the changing price of labor.  In order to make his argument, Marx states that he will leave out two certain factors of change (the expenses of labor power that differ with each mode of production and the diversity of labor power between men and women, children and adults) and that he will also be making two assumptions. The two assumptions made are that (1) the commodities are sold at their values; and (2) the price of labor-power occasionally rises above its value, but it never falls beneath it.

Given these assumptions, Marx begins to formulate his argument by first establishing the three determinants of the price of labor power. These three determinants, or circumstances as Marx calls them, are the length of the working day, the normal intensity of labor and the productiveness of labor. Formulating these three circumstances into different combinations of variables and constants, Marx begins to clarify the changes in magnitude in the price of labor-power.  The majority of Chapter XVII is dedicated to the chief combinations of these three factors.

I. Length of the working day and Intensity of labor constant; Productiveness of labor variable. 
Starting out with these assumptions, Marx explains that there are three laws that determine the value of labor-power. The first of these three laws states that a working day of given number of hours will always produce the same amount of value. This value will always be a constant, no matter the productiveness of labor, or the price of the commodity produced. The second states that the surplus-value and labor-power are negatively correlated or that when surplus-value increases a unit and value stays the same labor-power must decrease one unit also. The third of these laws is that a change in surplus-value presupposes a change in that of the labor-power.

Given these three laws, Marx explains how the productiveness of labor, being the variable, changes the magnitude of labor-value. Marx explains that "a change in the magnitude of surplus-value, presupposes a movement in the value of labour-power, which movement is brought about by a variation in the productiveness of labour". This variation in the productiveness of labor is what eventually leads to the developing change in value which is then divided by either the laborers through extra labor-value, or the capitalist through extra surplus value.

II. Working-day constant; Productiveness of labor constant; Intensity of labor variable. 
The Intensity of labor is the expenditure that the laborer puts into a commodity. The increase in the intensity of labor results in the increase of value that the labor is producing. This increase that the laborer is producing is again divided amongst the capitalist and laborer in the form of either surplus-value or an increase in the value of labor power. Although they may both increase simultaneously, the addition to the labor may not be an addition if the extra payment received from his increase in intensity does not cover the wear and tear it has on the laborer.

III. Productivity and Intensity of Labor Constant; Length of Working Day variable. 
In this example, it is possible to change the length of the working day by either lengthening or shortening the time spent at work. Leaving the other two variables constant, reducing the length of the work day leaves the labor-power's value the same as it was before. This reducing of the length of the work day will reduce the surplus labor and surplus value dropping it below its value.

The other option in changing the workday is to lengthen it. If the labor-power stays the same with a longer workday, then the surplus-value will increase relatively and absolutely. The relative value of labor-power will fall even if it will not fall absolutely. With the lengthening of the workday and the nominal price staying the same, the price of labor-power possibly could fall below its value. The value is estimated to be what is produced by the worker and a longer workday will affect the production and therefore the value.

It is fine to assume the other variables stay constant, but a change in the work day with the others constant will not result in the outcomes supposed here. A change in the work day by the capitalists will most definitely affect the productivity and intensity of the labor.

IV. Simultaneous Variations in the Duration, Productivity and Intensity of Labor. 
In the real world, it is almost never possible to isolate each of the aspects of labor. Two or even three of the variables may vary and in different aspects. One may move up while another moves down, or in the same direction. The combinations are endless, but may be characterized by the first three examples. However, Marx limits his analysis to two cases:
 "Diminishing productivity of labor with a simultaneous lengthening of the workday". This example is one where workers are working longer hours paying less attention or dedication on the job and productivity is in turn reduced; or productivity decreases, increasing the workday to achieve the same output. Therefore, the magnitude of these changes will continue on its path causing longer and longer workdays with lower productivity until the system can sustain no more.
 "Increasing intensity and productivity of labor with simultaneous shortening of the working day". Productivity and intensity are closely related and offer similar outcomes. Higher productivity and intensity will increase the workers output, allowing for the workday to be shorter as they will achieve their necessary subsistence. The working day can shrink multiple times so long as the other elements live up to their sides of the bargain.

The price of labour-power is affected by many things that can be broken down. The three main elements of intensity, productivity and length of workday were broken down and analyzed separately and then together. From the examples presented, it is possible to see what would happen in any and all situations.

Part Six: Wages 
In Chapters 19–22, Marx examines the ways in which capital manipulates the money wage as ways of both concealing exploitation and of extorting increased amounts of unpaid labor from workers.

Chapter 19: The Transformation of the Value (and Respective Price) of Labour-Power into Wages 
In this chapter, Marx discusses how the "value of labor-power is represented in its converted form as wages". The form of wages is intended to disguise the division of the working day into necessary labor (labor that is for the value of labor-power) and surplus labor (labor that is totally toward the profit of the capitalist). In other words, paid and unpaid labor for the worker. The worker in this situation feels as though he is using his labor as means of producing surplus for his own consumption, when in reality his labor-power has already been purchased by the capitalist and he merely works as a means to produce surplus value for the capitalist.

There are two distinct forms of wages that is used in the production of capital, namely time-wages and piece-wages. These forms facilitate the illusion of the actual value of labor-power and the increase of productivity from the worker employed.

Chapter 20: Time-Wages 
Marx presents the unit for measurement of time-wages to be the value of the day's labour-power divided by the number of hours in the average working day. However, an extension in the period of labour produces a fall in the price of labour, culminating in the fall in the daily or weekly wage. Yet as Marx specifies, this is to the advantage of the capitalist as more hours of production leads to surplus value for the capitalist, stating: "If one man does the work of 1½ or 2 men, the supply of labor increases, although the supply of labor-power on the market remains constant.  The competition thus created between the workers allows the capitalist to force down the price of labor, while the fall in price allows him, on the other hand, to force up the hours of work even further". To make the worker feel his extra time and labour is well spent, the capitalist employs the trick of overtime.

Chapter 21: Piece-Wages 
Marx explains the exploitative nature of the piece-wage system. Under this system, workers are paid a pre-determined amount for each piece they produce, creating a modified form of the time-wage system. A key difference is in the fact that the piece-wage system provides an exact measure of the intensity of labor, meaning that the capitalists know about how long it takes to produce one piece of finished product. Those who cannot meet these standards of production will not be allowed to keep their jobs. This system also allows for middlemen (wholesaler or reseller) to usurp positions between the capitalists and laborers. These middlemen make their money solely from paying labor less than capitalists are actually allotting, thus bringing about worker on worker exploitation.

Logic would lead a laborer to believe that straining one's labor power "as intensely as possible" works in one's own interests because the more efficiently they produce the more they will be paid. Therefore, the workday will lengthen to the extent that worker's allow and necessitate. However, prolongation in the workday requires the price of labor to fall. Marx elucidates that "the piece-wage therefore has a tendency, while raising the wages of individuals above the average, to lower this average itself," and "it is apparent that the piece-wage is the form of wage most appropriate to the capitalist mode of production". He gives examples of the weaving industry around the time of the Anti-Jacobin War where "piece-wages had fallen so low that in spite of the very great lengthening of the working day, the daily wage was then lower than it had been before".  In this example, we are able to see how piece-wages do nothing but decrease the value of labor and better disguise the true way the workers are exploited.

Part Seven: The Process of Accumulation of Capital 
In Chapters 23–25, Marx explores the ways in which profits are used to recreate capitalist class relations on an ever expanding scale and the ways in which this expansion of capitalism creates periodic crises for capitalist accumulation. For Marx, these crises in accumulation are also always crises in the perpetuation of the class relations necessary for capitalist production and so are also opportunities for revolutionary change.

Chapter 23: Simple Reproduction

Chapter 24: The Transformation of Surplus-Value into Capital

Capitalist production on a progressively increasing scale. The inversion which converts the property laws of commodity production into laws of capitalist appropriation

The political economists' erroneous conception of reproduction on an increasing scale

Division of surplus-value into capital and revenue. The abstinence theory 

The circumstances which independently of the proportional division of surplus-value into capital and revenue determine the extent of accumulation:
 The degree of exploitation of labour-power.
 The productivity of labour.
 The growing difference in amount between capital employed and capital consumed.
 The magnitude of the capital advanced.

Chapter 25, Sections 3 and 4: The General Law of Capitalist Accumulation 
Although originally appearing as its quantitative extension only, the accumulation of capital is effected under a progressive qualitative change in its composition and a constant increase of its constant at the expense of its variable constituent. Capitalist production can by no means content itself with the quantity of disposable labour-power which the natural increase of population yields. It requires for its free play an industrial reserve army independent of these natural limits. Up to this point, it has been assumed that the increase or diminution of the variable capital corresponds rigidly with the increase or diminution of the number of labourers employed. The number of labourers commanded by capital may remain the same or even fall while the variable capital increases. This is the case if the individual labourer yields more labour and therefore his wages increase and this, although the price of labour remains the same or even falls, only more slowly than the mass of labour rises. In this case, increase of variable capital becomes an index of more labour, but not of more labourers employed. It is the absolute interest of every capitalist to press a given quantity of labour out of a smaller, rather than a greater number of labourers, if the cost is about the same. In the latter case, the outlay of constant capital increases in proportion to the mass of labour set in action; in the former that increase is much smaller. The more extended the scale of production, the stronger this motive. Its force increases with the accumulation of capital.

We have seen that the development of the capitalist mode of production and of the productive power of labour—at once the cause and effect of accumulation—enables the capitalist, with the same outlay of variable capital, to set in action more labour by greater exploitation (extensive or intensive) of each individual labour-power. We have further seen that the capitalist buys with the same capital a greater mass of labour-power as he progressively replaces skilled labourers by less skilled, mature labour-power by immature, male by female, that of adults by that of young persons or children. On the one hand, with the progress of accumulation a larger variable capital sets more labour in action without enlisting more labourers; on the other, a variable capital of the same magnitude sets in action more labour with the same mass of labour-power; and, finally, a greater number of inferior labour-power by displacement of higher.

The production of a relative surplus-population, or the setting free of labourers, goes on therefore yet more rapidly than the technical revolution of the process of production that accompanies and is accelerated by, the advances of accumulation; and more rapidly than the corresponding diminution of the variable part of capital as compared with the constant. If the means of production, as they increase in extent and effective power, become to a less extent means of employment of labourers, this state of things is again modified by the fact that in proportion as the productiveness of labour increases, capital increases its supply of labour more quickly than its demand for labourers. The over-work of the employed part of the working class swells the ranks of the reserve whilst conversely the greater pressure that the latter by its competition exerts on the former, forces these to submit to over-work and to subjugation under the dictates of capital. The condemnation of one part of the working-class to enforced idleness by the over-work of the other part and the converse becomes a means of enriching the individual capitalists and accelerates at the same time the production of the industrial reserve army on a scale corresponding with the advance of social accumulation. How important is this element in the formation of the relative surplus-population is shown by the example of England. Her technical means for saving labour are colossal. Nevertheless, if to-morrow morning labour generally were reduced to a rational amount and proportioned to the different sections of the working-class according to age and sex, the working population to hand would be absolutely insufficient for the carrying on of national production on its present scale. The great majority of the labourers now unproductive would have to be turned into productive ones.

This is the place to return to one of the grand exploits of economic apologetics. It will be remembered that if through the introduction of new, or the extension of old, machinery, a portion of variable capital is transformed into constant, the economic apologist interprets this operation which fixes capital and by that very act sets labourers free in exactly the opposite way, pretending that it sets free capital for the labourers. Only now can one fully understand the effrontery of these apologists. What are set free are not only the labourers immediately turned out by the machines, but also their future substitutes in the rising generation and the additional contingent that with the usual extension of trade on the old basis would be regularly absorbed. They are now all set free and every new bit of capital looking out for employment can dispose of them. Whether it attracts them or others, the effect on the general labour demand will be nil, if this capital is just sufficient to take out of the market as many labourers as the machines threw upon it. If it employs a smaller number, that of the supernumeraries increases; if it employs a greater, the general demand for labour only increases to the extent of the excess of the employed over those set free. The impulse that additional capital, seeking an outlet, would otherwise have given to the general demand for labour, is therefore in every case neutralised to the extent of the labourers thrown out of employment by the machine. That is to say, the mechanism of capitalistic production so manages matters that the absolute increase of capital is accompanied by no corresponding rise in the general demand for labour. Thus, the apologist calls a compensation for the misery, the sufferings, the possible death of the displaced labourers during the transition period that banishes them into the industrial reserve army out of antagonism of capital accumulation. The demand for labour is not identical with increase of capital, nor supply of labour with increase of the working class. It is not a case of two independent forces working on one another—dés sont pipés.

Capital works on both sides at the same time. If its accumulation on the one hand increases the demand for labour, it increases on the other the supply of labourers by the setting free of them whilst at the same time the pressure of the unemployed compels those that are employed to furnish more labour and therefore makes the supply of labour, to a certain extent, independent of the supply of labourers. The action of the law of supply and demand of labour on this basis completes the despotism of capital. Therefore, as soon as the labourers learn the secret, how it comes to pass that in the same measure as they work more as they produce more wealth for others and as the productive power of their labour increases so in the same measure even their function as a means of the self-expansion of capital becomes more and more precarious for them; as soon as they discover that the degree of intensity of the competition among themselves depends wholly on the pressure of the relative surplus population; and as soon as they try to organise by trade unions a regular co-operation between employed and unemployed in order to destroy or to weaken the ruinous effects of this natural law of capitalistic production on their class, so soon capital and its sycophant political economy cry out at the infringement of the eternal and so to say sacred law of supply and demand. Every combination of employed and unemployed disturbs the harmonious action of this law. On the other hand, as soon as (e.g. in the colonies) adverse circumstances prevent the creation of an industrial reserve army and with it the absolute dependence of the working class upon the capitalist class, capital, along with its commonplace Sancho Panza, rebels against the sacred law of supply and demand and tries to check its inconvenient action by forcible means and state interference.

Part Eight: So-called Primitive Accumulation

Chapter 26: The Secret of Primitive Accumulation 
In order to understand the desire for and techniques utilized by the bourgeoisie to accumulate capital before the rise of capitalism itself, one must look to the notion of primitive accumulation as the main impetus for this drastic change in history. Primitive accumulation refers to the essential lucrative method employed by the capitalist class that brought about the transition in to the capitalist mode of production following the end of the feudal system. Marx states that the means of production and a bare level of subsistence must be stripped from the common producer to allow for this to take place. The means of production refers to the tools or processes used to create a product or provide a service.

Chapter 27: Expropriation of the Agricultural Population From the Land 
The central process for and secret behind primitive accumulation involved the expropriation of agricultural lands and any form of wealth from the population of commoners by the capitalists which typically was characterized by brutal and violent struggles between the two opposing classes. Since the peasantry was not subjected to the laws of feudalism any longer, they were ultimately freed from their lords and the land to assimilate into this new mode of production as a wage laborer. As a result, every freed proletariat had only their labor power to sell to the bourgeoisie to meet their needs to simply survive. Marx refers to the Inclosure Act 1489, the Inclosure Act 1533 and the Poor Relief Act 1601.

Chapter 28: Bloody Legislation Against the Expropriated, from the End of the 15th Century. Forcing Down of Wages by Acts of Parliament 
The integration process into this new mode of production came at a cost to the proletariat since the strenuous demands of finding alternative work proved to be too much of a burden for most. As a result, the working class often initially resorted to thievery and begging to meet their needs under this new form of human existence. To make matters worse, harsh legislation seen in England and France declared these individuals to be vagabonds and rogues subject to the laws of the state. Furthermore, the working class also suffered due to legislative measures taken in England to keep working wages astonishingly low while the cost of living rose. In particular, Marx refers to the Vagabonds Act of 1530, the Act for Punishment of Sturdy Vagabonds and Beggars 1536, the Vagabonds Act 1547, the Vagabonds Act 1572, the Poor Act 1575, the Vagabonds Act 1597 and the Vagabonds Act 1603 which was only repealed by the Vagrants Act 1713. Marx also recounts wage fixing legislation, including the Statute of Labourers 1351, the Statute of Apprentices (which was extended to weavers by King James I), the Journeymen Tailors, London Act 1720, the Silk Manufacturers Act 1772 and the Colliers (Scotland) Act 1799.

Chapter 29: Genesis of the Capitalist Farmer 
The origin of the capitalists in England spawned out of the "great landed proprietors" who reaped the benefits of the surplus value made from the expropriated land they had acquired at practically no cost. The progressive fall of the value of precious metals and money brought more profit to the capitalist farmers as the wage laborers beneath them were forced to accept lower wages. It comes as no surprise that the class of capitalist farmers in England became enormously wealthy given the circumstances of the time.

Chapter 30: Reaction of the Agricultural Revolution on Industry. Creation of the Home-Market for Industrial Capital 
The British Agricultural Revolution (17th–19th centuries) not only caused many changes in the way people worked, but in social structure as well. When industrialisation provided the cheapest and most efficient tools for agricultural production, it caused a reduced need for the peasant farm workers which displaced most of the working class from the countryside. Faced with the choice of selling their labor for a wage or becoming a capitalist, there emerged a class of entrepreneurs who through the exploitation of wage laborers became the capitalist class. As the system grew, there became a need for cheaper and more readily available materials, thus colonization was born. By expanding into new territories and enslaving indigenous cultures, primitive accumulation became a source of quick and easy capital. Famine even became a tool for capitalists in 1769–1770 when England raised the price of rice in India so that only the rich could afford it. National debt soon became a tool of control for capitalists who turned unproductive money into capital through lending and exchange. Encouraged to participate in the creation of debt, each worker participates in the creation of "joint-stock companies, the stock-exchange, and modern bankocracy". The international credit system conceals the source of its generation, i.e. the exploitation of slave and wage laborers.

Chapter 31: The Genesis of the Industrial Capitalist 
The shift in the ownership of the means of production from the proletariat to the bourgeoisie left the common producer with only his labor power to sell. This means they are free proprietors of the conditions of their labor.  During this process of transference, private property was replaced by capitalist private property through the highest form of exploitation and the shift from the days of free labor to wage labor had taken place. Capitalist private property was formed from the capital mode of appropriation which dwindled away the once existent private property founded on the personal labor of workers.

Chapter 32: Historical Tendency of Capitalist Accumulation 
Marx states that as capitalism grows, the number of wage laborers grows exponentially. Therefore, ultimately there will be a revolution in which the capitalists are expropriated from their means of wealth by the majority. In other words, the seeds of destruction are already implanted within capitalism. Marx stresses that the demise of capitalism does not necessarily mean the return of feudalism and private property, but rather "it does indeed establish individual property on the basis of the achievements of the capitalist era, namely co-operation and the possession in common of the land and the means of production produced by labor itself". That is to say that the transformation will revert to the time where private property is seen as social property.

Chapter 33: The Modern Theory of Colonization 
Marx claims that two types of private property exist in a political economy. The first form is the labor of the producer himself and the other form rests in a capitalist's exploitation of others. In the industrialized capitalist world of Western Europe, this is easily attained through the usage of laws and private property. However, capitalists constantly find obstacles in the colonies where workers work for their own enrichment rather than that of the capitalist. Capitalists overcome this obstacle by the use of force and by the political backing of the motherland. If domination over the workers free will cannot be achieved, Marx then asks, "how did capital and wage-labour come into existence?" This comes about through the division of workers into owners of capital and owners of labor. This system causes workers to essentially expropriate themselves in order to accumulate capital. This self-expropriation served as primitive accumulation for the capitalists and therefore was the catalyst for capitalism in the colonies.

Publication history 
During his life, Karl Marx oversaw the first and second German language editions as well as a third edition in French. This French edition was to be an important basis of the third German edition that Friedrich Engels instead oversaw after Marx died in 1883.

The Marx-Engels-Gesamtausgabe contains critical editions with apparatus the different editions.

There are a number of different English translations. There is some controversy as to the choice of edition that has been translated as representing this work to foreign language readers.

As Marx notes in the afterword to the second German edition of Capital, Marx's different editions of Capital reflect his reworking of published material especially in the presentation of the work particularly on the theory of value.

The Marx-Engels-Gesamtausgabe contains the four variants of Capital, Volume I in their entirety.

In spite of enormous effort, Marx did not live to complete his goal to publish the remaining volumes of Das Kapital. After Marx died, Engels published as editor and in some ways expanded from Marx's economic manuscripts of volumes II (1885) and III (1894). Scholars are divided over which of several plans for the work was Marx's final. Because the project was not definitively completed, volume one's role in the critique of political economy leaves unanswered scientific questions that Marxian political economists continue to debate.

Presentation method and literary form 
Marxian political economists are divided over the methodological character driving Marx's choice of presentation order of economic concepts, a question frustrating quicker completion of this book in Marx's adult life.

There are logical, historical, sociological and other interpretations attempting to clarify method which Marx did not explain because his writing project on dialectics had lower priority than other matters.

Since 1867, scholars have promoted different interpretations of the purpose driving volume one's long and oftentimes expansive argument. Key writers include Louis Althusser, Harry Cleaver, Richard D. Wolff, David Harvey, Michael Lebowitz, Moishe Postone, Fred Moseley, Michael Heinrich and others. In the Arabic world, Marx's ideas were discussed by thinkers such as Sadiq Jalal Al-Azm, Al-Tayyeb Tizini, Rizgar Akrawi and others.

There exist multiple plans for the project of Das Kapital and consequently whether or not Marx did complete his project is an ongoing debate among Marxian political economists.

Notes

References 

 
 
 
 
 
 
 
 Althusser, Louis; Balibar, Étienne (2009). Reading Capital. London: Verso.
 Althusser, Louis (1969) (October 1969). "How to Read Marx's Capital". Marxism Today. pp. 302–305. Originally appeared in French in L'Humanité on 21 April 1969.
 Bottomore, Tom, ed. (1998). A Dictionary of Marxist Thought. Oxford: Blackwell.
 Fine, Ben (2010). Marx's Capital. 5th ed. London: Pluto.
 Furner, James (2018). Marx on Capitalism: The Interaction-Recognition-Antinomy Thesis. Leiden: Brill.
 Harvey, David (2010). A Companion to Marx's Capital. London: Verso.
 Harvey, David (2006). The Limits of Capital. London: Verso.
 Mandel, Ernest (1970). Marxist Economic Theory. New York: Monthly Review Press.
 Postone, Moishe (1993). Time, Labor, and Social Domination: A Reinterpretation of Marx's Critical Theory. Cambridge: Cambridge University Press.
 
 Shipside, Steve (2009). Karl Marx's Das Kapital: A Modern-day Interpretation of a True Classic. Oxford: Infinite Ideas. 
 Wheen, Francis (2006). Marx's Das Kapital--A Biography. New York: Atlantic Monthly Press. . .

See also 
 Das Kapital
 Capital, Volume II
 Capital, Volume III
 Marx-Engels-Gesamtausgabe

Notes

External links 

 Marx, Karl (1867). Capital, Volume I. Full text at the Marxists Internet Archive.
 Capital Volume I, complete book in PDF format by Progress Publishers
 Marx, Karl (1887). Capital, Volume I. HTML5 version of the 1887 English edition.
 
 Marxist analyses of Karl Marx’s “Capital” at the Marxists Internet Archive.
 Engels, Fredrich (1868). Synopsis of Capital, Volume I.
 Gellert, Hugo (1934). Capital in Lithographs.
 Rozdolsky, Roman (1977). "The Making of Marx's Capital".
 Teeple, Gary (1984). "Notes for the Study of Marx's Capital: Volume One". 2022 revised version.
 Harvey, David (2010). "A Companion to Marx's Capital".
 Harvey, David. "Reading Marx's Capital". An open course consisting of a close reading of the text of Marx's Capital, Volume I in thirteen video lectures.
 Hardt, Michael. "Reading Notes on Marx's Capital".
 Cleaver, Harry. "Study Guide to Capital, Volume I".
 "The MarX-Files: Resources on Karl Marx and Friedrich Engels".
 Hans Ehrbar (2010). Annotations to Karl Marx's Capital.
 Clarke, Simon (2011). "Reading Guide to Capital".
 "Japan gives a comic twist to 'Das Kapital'". The Irish Times. 21 November 2008. Retrieved 24 April 2019.
 Liberation School. (2021). "Reading Capital with Comrades". A 12-part podcast series on volume 1.

1867 books
1867 in economics
Books by Karl Marx
Marxist works
Memory of the World Register

de:Das Kapital. Band I